Borte, Börte, Boerte or Børte is a given name and surname. Notable people with the name include:

 Börte (c.1161–1230), wife of Temüjin, the founder of the Mongol Empire
Derrick Borte (born 1967), German-born American filmmaker
Torstein Børte (1899–1985), Norwegian politician